Abhi Tou Main Jawan Hoon is a 2013 Pakistani television film directed by Nadeem Baig and written by Vasay Chaudhry. The telefilm stars Mikaal Zulfiqar and Ayesha Khan in lead roles with Bushra Ansari, Atiqa Odho and Saba Hameed in prominent roles. The film is a remake of old classic of the same name released in 1978 starring Shabnum, Shahid and Sabiha Khanum.

Plot 
Faisal is young and handsome man with a promising career in acting and is in love with Zehra (Ayesha Khan). However, in order to convince Zehra's father to give her daughter's hand in marriage, Faisal is forced to lie about his profession. He blatantly lies him by telling that he works in a hotel as a general manager, however, Zehra's father asks him to prove his employment there. Faisal's life becomes even more problematic when he finds out that the minimum age requirement for the post is 15. To keep up with his lie, Faisal disguises as an old man, however, a new problem is waiting for him at the corner.

Cast 
 Mikaal Zulfiqar as Faisal
 Ayesha Khan as Zara
 Bushra Ansari
 Saba Hameed
 Atiqa Odho
 Usman Peerzada
 Humayun Saeed (cameo)

References

External links 
 
 

2013 television films
2013 films
Pakistani television films